Gary Dempsey (born 22 November 1948) is a former Australian rules footballer who played for the Footscray Football Club and North Melbourne Football Club in the Victorian Football League (VFL). A fine ruckman known for his strong marking, Dempsey won the Brownlow Medal in 1975 and had a total of thirteen top-10 finishes in the vote count. He is also one of a handful of players to have played at least 100 games and won a best-and-fairest award at two different clubs.

Playing career
Dempsey made his debut for Footscray in 1967. In 1969, he spent six weeks in hospital after being badly burnt by a bushfire near his home in Truganina and was told he would never play football again. Despite this, he defied the odds to return to the playing field and then win his first club best-and-fairest award in 1970. Dempsey would win the club best-and-fairest award five more times, underlining his importance to the underachieving Bulldogs.

Although he had won a number of individual awards, Dempsey yearned for team success and signed with North Melbourne in 1979, winning the club best-and-fairest in his first year there. He played out his career at the Kangaroos, playing 122 games for them, and retired in 1984. Dempsey was named an emergency in the Kangaroos Team of the Century.

Dempsey finished in the top 10 in the Brownlow Medal 13 times.  He was named an All-Australian Team member at the 1972 Perth carnival.

Dempsey went into the 1984 VFL season affected by injuries and advancing age. He was now 35—a "dinosaur" as he would describe himself in his retirement announcement—and had suffered a hurt knee in the practice games and later a fractured cheekbone. His final VFL match was in Round 8 against  at Arden Street, which the Swans won by seven points. He revealed that he had begun thinking about retirement midway through the last quarter: "I was playing at fullback and I realised I was not helping North. There's no point in me going on if I can't help North." He formally announced his retirement on the Monday following the game.

Gary Dempsey then moved north in 1986 and played two seasons for Southport, winning his first ever senior premiership with the Sharks in 1987.

Dempsey held the all-time record for most marks in VFL/AFL history until his record was surpassed in 2017 by Nick Riewoldt.  

In 1996, Dempsey was inducted into the Australian Football Hall of Fame.

In 2002, Dempsey was named as first ruckman in the Footscray's Team of the Century.

Post playing career
Dempsey was appointed specialist ruck coach of the Carlton Football Club at the end of the 2005 season.

References

Bibliography

External links
 
 
 Australian Football Hall of Fame - Players

Australian rules footballers from Victoria (Australia)
1948 births
Living people
Brownlow Medal winners
Australian Football Hall of Fame inductees
All-Australians (1953–1988)
Syd Barker Medal winners
North Melbourne Football Club players
Western Bulldogs players
Southport Australian Football Club players
Victorian State of Origin players
Charles Sutton Medal winners